Ocriticum was an Italic and Roman town, the ruins of which are located in the comune of Cansano, in the province of L'Aquila in the Abruzzo region of Italy.

There are the remains of two Italic/Roman temples of Jupiter and Hercules, and a sacellum of Ceres and Venus, as well as remains of the ancient settlement.

References

External links

Roman sites of Abruzzo
Cansano